Ion Dumitru (born 2 January 1950), commonly known as Liță Dumitru, is a Romanian former professional footballer, and manager who played as a midfielder from 1967 until 1989.

He is currently a youth coach at the Kalonji Soccer Academy in Atlanta, Georgia.

Career
A Romanian international, Dumitru represented his country at the 1970 FIFA World Cup. Regarded as one of Romania's greatest players he won the Romanian Footballer of the Year in 1973 and 1975.

International stats

International goals
''Scores and results table. "Score" indicates the score after the player's goal:

Honours

Player
Rapid București 
Cupa României: 1971–72

Steaua București
Divizia A: 1975–76, 1977–78
Cupa României: 1975–76, 1978–79

Politehnica Timișoara
Cupa României runner-up: 1980–81
    
Universitatea Craiova
Cupa României: 1982–83

Individual
Romanian Footballer of the Year: 1973, 1975

Coach
Würzburger Kickers
Landesliga Bayern-Nord: 1989–90

Jiul Petroșani
Divizia B: 1995–96

Al-Jaish 
Syrian League: 1999
Arab Club Championship runner-up: 1999

References

External links 
 
 

1950 births
Living people
Footballers from Bucharest
Romanian footballers
Olympic footballers of Romania
Romania international footballers
Association football forwards
FC Rapid București players
FC Steaua București players
CS Universitatea Craiova players
FC Politehnica Timișoara players
FC CFR Timișoara players
1970 FIFA World Cup players
Romanian football managers
Romanian expatriate football managers
FC Rapid București managers
Liga I players
Liga II players
FC Politehnica Timișoara managers
FC Progresul București managers
CSM Jiul Petroșani managers
AFC Rocar București managers
CS Concordia Chiajna managers
Würzburger Kickers managers
Al-Ta'ee managers
Expatriate football managers in Saudi Arabia
Expatriate football managers in Syria
Expatriate football managers in Germany
Romanian expatriate sportspeople in Saudi Arabia
Romanian expatriate sportspeople in Syria
Romanian expatriate sportspeople in Germany
Romanian expatriate sportspeople in the United States
Saudi Professional League managers
Liga I managers
Liga II managers